The 1988 European Tour, titled as the 1988 Volvo Tour for sponsorship reasons, was the 17th official season of golf tournaments known as the PGA European Tour. It marked the beginning of a long association for the tour with Swedish car maker Volvo, who became the tour's first official title sponsor.

The season was made up of 29 tournaments counting for the Order of Merit, and several non-counting "Approved Special Events".

The Order of Merit was won by Spain's Seve Ballesteros.

Changes for 1988
There were several changes from the previous season, with the addition of the Open de Baleares, the Biarritz Open, the English Open and the Volvo Masters; the return of the Barcelona Open, which had been cancelled due to bad weather in 1987; and the loss of the Lawrence Batley International. The Moroccan Open, originally scheduled to open the season, was initially postponed until October but ultimately cancelled.

Schedule
The following table lists official events during the 1988 season.

Unofficial events
The following events were sanctioned by the European Tour, but did not carry official money, nor were wins official.

Order of Merit
The Order of Merit was titled as the Volvo Order of Merit and was based on prize money won during the season, calculated in Pound sterling.

Awards

See also
List of golfers with most European Tour wins

Notes

References

External links
1988 season results on the PGA European Tour website
1988 Order of Merit on the PGA European Tour website

European Tour seasons
European Tour